Coll Donaldson (born 9 April 1995) is a Scottish professional footballer who plays as a centre-back for Falkirk. He has previously played for Livingston, Queens Park Rangers, Dundee United, Inverness Caledonian Thistle, Ross County and Dunfermline Athletic.

Club career
Donaldson grew up in North Berwick, East Lothian, and attended North Berwick High School, joining Livingston's youth ranks in 2011 from Tynecastle. After progressing through the club's youth system and impressing for the reserve team, he signed a new two-year contract for Livingston on 17 January 2013. Later that month he went on trial with Premier League club Manchester United. He made his first-team debut for Livingston as a late substitute against Dunfermline Athletic on 30 March 2013. He then went on to make a further four appearances towards the end of season 2012–13. In December 2013, Donaldson was allowed to travel to Queens Park Rangers for a trial. In January 2014, Donaldson completed his move to Queens Park Rangers, for a fee of around £150,000. In all he made 29 appearances in all competitions, scoring once.

On 28 January 2014, aged 19 Donaldson joined Queens Park Rangers from Livingston after impressing QPR manager Harry Redknapp during a week-long trial. Donaldson made his senior and Championship debut on 3 May 2014 in a 3–2 away win against Barnsley at Oakwell, where he was named in the starting line up and played the full 90 minutes.

On 13 July 2015, Donaldson joined Scottish Premiership side Dundee United on a three-year contract following his release from QPR. Donaldson was released on 7 August 2017, after two seasons with the club.

Later that month, he signed a short-term contract with Inverness Caledonian Thistle. In December 2017, he extended his Inverness contract for a further two and a half years.

Donaldson moved to Ross County in January 2020 for an undisclosed transfer fee. He made his debut in a 1-0 defeat to Ayr United in the Scottish Cup.

In January 2022, Donaldson reunited with former boss John Hughes after joining Dunfermline Athletic on loan for the rest of the season.

Donaldson signed a two-year contract with Falkirk in May 2022.

Career statistics

Honours
Dundee United
 Scottish Challenge Cup: 2016–17

References

External links

1995 births
Living people
Footballers from East Lothian
Association football defenders
Scottish footballers
Livingston F.C. players
Queens Park Rangers F.C. players
Dundee United F.C. players
Scottish Football League players
Scottish Professional Football League players
English Football League players
People educated at North Berwick High School
Inverness Caledonian Thistle F.C. players
Ross County F.C. players
Dunfermline Athletic F.C. players
Falkirk F.C. players